An irregular galaxy is a galaxy that does not have a distinct regular shape, unlike a spiral or an elliptical galaxy. Irregular galaxies do not fall into any of the regular classes of the Hubble sequence, and they are often chaotic in appearance, with neither a nuclear bulge nor any trace of spiral arm structure.

Collectively they are thought to make up about a quarter of all galaxies. Some irregular galaxies were once spiral or elliptical galaxies but were deformed by an uneven external gravitational force. Irregular galaxies may contain abundant amounts of gas and dust. This is not necessarily true for dwarf irregulars.

Irregular galaxies are commonly small, about one tenth the mass of the Milky Way galaxy.  Due to their small sizes, they are prone to environmental effects like crashing with large galaxies and intergalactic clouds.

Types
There are three major types of irregular galaxies:

 An Irr-I galaxy (Irr I) is an irregular galaxy that features some structure but not enough to place it cleanly into the Hubble sequence. 
Subtypes with some spiral structure are called Sm galaxies
Subtypes without spiral structure are called Im galaxies.

 An Irr-II galaxy (Irr II) is an irregular galaxy that does not appear to feature any structure that can place it into the Hubble sequence.

 A dI-galaxy (or dIrr) is a dwarf irregular galaxy. This type of galaxy is now thought to be important to understand the overall evolution of galaxies, as they tend to have a low level of metallicity and relatively high levels of gas, and are thought to be similar to the earliest galaxies that populated the Universe. They may represent a local (and therefore more recent) version of the faint blue galaxies known to exist in deep field galaxy surveys.

Some of the irregular galaxies, especially of the Magellanic type, are small spiral galaxies that are being distorted by the gravity of a larger neighbor.

Magellanic Clouds

The Magellanic Cloud galaxies were once classified as irregular galaxies. The Large Magellanic Cloud has since been re-classified as type SBm (barred Magellanic spiral). The Small Magellanic Cloud remains classified as an irregular galaxy of type Im under current galaxy morphological classification, although it does contain a bar structure.

Gallery

See also 
 Dwarf galaxy
 Dwarf elliptical galaxy
 Peculiar galaxy
 Galaxy morphological classification

References

External links

 
Galaxy morphological types